Mark de Solla Price (born May 17, 1960, in New Haven, Connecticut) is an author, journalist, public speaker, civil rights activist, and HIV/AIDS educator. Price is a long-time Greenwich Village resident and a Unitarian Universalist, and the author of the book Living Positively in a World with HIV/AIDS.  He was a featured subject (along with his late husband Vinny Allegrini) in the HBO documentary Positively Naked with Spencer Tunick.

Formerly Director of Information Technology for CDM Publishing, LLC (Smart + Strong : POZ Real Health AIDSmeds ComboCards).

He is the son of the historian of science Derek J. de Solla Price. He is of Spanish-Jewish and English-Jewish descent on his father's side, and his mother is Danish.

Price was widowed when his husband Vinny Allegrini died at 66 on March 4, 2015, from an AIDS-related cirrhosis.

Bibliography 

 Living Positively in a World with HIV/AIDS - Avon Books ,  (1995)

References

External links 
 Official Website
 Mark's HIV Blog
 
 Positively Naked

1960 births
Living people
Writers from New Haven, Connecticut
Writers from New York (state)
American essayists
American people of English-Jewish descent
American people of Danish descent
American people of Spanish-Jewish descent
American self-help writers
American spiritual writers
American Unitarian Universalists
American gay writers
HIV/AIDS activists
Jewish American writers
American LGBT rights activists
People with HIV/AIDS
American male essayists
21st-century American Jews